Danielle Adams (September 24, 1983 – December 9, 2021) was a Canadian politician, who was elected to the Legislative Assembly of Manitoba in the 2019 Manitoba general election. She represented the electoral district of Thompson as a member of the New Democratic Party of Manitoba.

Prior to her election to the provincial legislature, she worked as a constituency assistant to federal Member of Parliament Niki Ashton, who represents Churchill—Keewatinook Aski on behalf of the federal New Democratic Party.

On December 9, 2021, Adams died at the age of 38 in a motor vehicle crash while driving south to Winnipeg on Manitoba Highway 6 after her SUV collided with a northbound semi-truck, 50 kilometres south of Ponton, Manitoba.

Electoral record

References

1983 births
2021 deaths
Accidental deaths in Manitoba
New Democratic Party of Manitoba MLAs
People from Thompson, Manitoba
Politicians from Edmonton
Road incident deaths in Canada
Women MLAs in Manitoba
21st-century Canadian politicians
21st-century Canadian women politicians